Joseph Coghlan  was an Irish politician.

Coghlan was educated at  Trinity College Dublin.

Coghlan represented Dublin University from 1689 to 1692; and Limerick City from 1695 until 1699.

References

Irish MPs 1689
Irish MPs 1695–1699
Members of the Parliament of Ireland (pre-1801) for County Dublin constituencies
Members of the Parliament of Ireland (pre-1801) for County Limerick constituencies
Alumni of Trinity College Dublin